The Tupella Family Tower House' is a cultural heritage monument in Mitrovica, Kosovo.

History
The wealthy Kosovo Albanian Tupella family built the house in the early 19th century. In 1912, the Kingdom of Yugoslavia’s government commandeered it as a prison for local dissidents. The tower house saw violence during the Kosovo Operation (1944). It was also used for torture and killings during a show trial over confiscated weaponry in 1956. Today, families live there who were expelled from northern Mitrovica.

References

Historic sites in Kosovo